Pyroeis in ancient Greek religion is the god of the wandering star (Aster Planetos / Astra Planeta) Areios, the planet Mars.

He is also known as Mesonyx (Μεσονυξ; "midnight").

His parents are Astraeus and Eos and his brother is Eosphoros.

See also
 List of Greek mythological figures

References

Greek gods
Titans (mythology)
Martian deities